Christopher Riggi (born September 18, 1985) is an American actor, known for his role as Scott Rosson in the teen drama television series Gossip Girl, and Jacob White in the Twilight parody film, Vampires Suck, which was released in the US on August 18, 2010.

Riggi was born in New York City, New York and is the son of philanthropists Michele and Ron Riggi. He started his career in 2008 in the short film Brotherhood as Jared, before moving onto screen works such as the independent films Toe to Toe and Dare. Additionally, Riggi made guest appearances in several TV series such as Human Giant and Lipstick Jungle.

Riggi played a role in The Wolf of Wall Street.

Filmography

References

External links
 

1985 births
21st-century American male actors
American male film actors
American male television actors
Living people
Male actors from New York City